The 1991 Southeast Asian Games, officially known as the 16th Southeast Asian Games, was a multi-sport event held in Manila, the Philippines from 24 November to 3 December 1991, with 28 sports featured in the games. This was the second time that the country hosted the games and its first since 1981. It was officially opened by President Corazon Aquino at the Rizal Memorial Stadium in Manila through a colorful opening ceremony. It was the only SEA Games at that time where the overall championship was heavily contested. The deciding medal came from the last sporting event - women's marathon where Indonesia got the gold medal.

Four sports (archery, canoeing, sailing, and triathlon) were held in venues in Subic Bay.

Fourteen years after the 1991 SEA Games, the country hosted the 2005 SEA Games. Another 14 years later, the Philippines hosted the 2019 Southeast Asian Games, which is the first that the event took place in the whole country.

This logo of 1991 Southeast Asian Games was designed by Ernesto A. Calaguas.

The games

Participating nations

 
 
 
 
 
  (Host)

Sports

Medal table

Key

Concerns and controversies

Reduction of gold medals
The Philippines should have tallied a total of 91 gold medals, but one of the gold medals from boxing was proclaimed unofficial. The said gold medal should have been fought by a Filipino boxer against a Thai boxer, but the latter was found positive in the doping tests. The gold medal was, at first, given to the Philippines, but after a few days, the SEAG Organizing Committee declared that there will be no gold and silver medalists for the said event in boxing because there was no battle fought.

See also
 2005 Southeast Asian Games
 2019 Southeast Asian Games

References

External links

 History of the SEA Games
 

 
Southeast Asian Games
1991 in multi-sport events
Southeast Asian Games, 1991
Southeast Asian Games
Sports in Manila
Multi-sport events in the Philippines
Southeast Asian Games
20th century in Manila